Amphinome is a genus of polychaetes belonging to the family Amphinomidae.

The genus has almost cosmopolitan distribution.

Species:

Amphinome abhortoni 
Amphinome anatifera 
Amphinome bruguieresi 
Amphinome carnea 
Amphinome chermesina 
Amphinome coccinea 
Amphinome denudata 
Amphinome djiboutiensis 
Amphinome eolides 
Amphinome jukesi 
Amphinome longosetosa 
Amphinome maldivensis 
Amphinome nigrobranchiata 
Amphinome pallida 
Amphinome praelonga 
Amphinome rostrata 
Amphinome savignyi 
Amphinome stylifera 
Amphinome umbo 
Amphinome vagans

References

Annelids